The Cigüela or Gigüela is a 225 km long river in Castile-La Mancha, Spain, tributary to the Guadiana. Its source is near the village Puerto de Cabrejas, Iberian System, Cuenca Province. The Cigüela along with the Záncara, its main tributary, is the main water source for the Tablas de Daimiel wetlands. Other tributaries are the Jualón, Torrejón, the Valdejudíos and the Amarguillo.

Záncara River flows into the Cigüela from the left near the Ojos del Guadiana, Villarrubia de los Ojos municipal term. There are authors though that claim that it is the Cigüela that flows into the Záncara.

See also 
 List of rivers of Spain

References

External links 
 Confederación hidrográfica del Guadiana

Rivers of Spain
Rivers of Castilla–La Mancha
Guadiana